St Martin's Mill is a Grade II listed, house converted tower mill in Canterbury, Kent, England.

History

St Martin's Mill was built in 1817 by John Adams. It was working until 1890 and was converted into a house by a Mr Couzens in 1920. There was a proposal to demolish the mill in April 1958, but a preservation order was placed on the mill by the Ministry of Housing and Local Government. The mill lost its sails in the 'Great Storm' of 1987 and they have not been replaced.

Description

St Martins Mill is a four-storey brick tower mill, rendered with cement. It had a Kentish-style cap, four single patent sails and was winded by a fantail. There was a stage at first-floor level. The windshaft is of cast iron. The Brake Wheel and Wallower survive, as does the drive to the sack hoist. The mill drove three pairs of stones.

Millers

Samuel Beard 1839
Thomas Marsh 1839, 1849
William Cannon 1845
M Gooderson 1859 – 1862
J Durrant 1862
Richardson
Bradley
Robinson
Bax
Coaks
Rackham
Lawrence

References for above:-

References

External links
Windmill World page on the mill.

Windmills in Kent
Grinding mills in the United Kingdom
Tower mills in the United Kingdom
Grade II listed buildings in Kent
Windmills completed in 1817
Buildings and structures in Canterbury
1817 establishments in England